This article lists the winners and nominees for the NAACP Image Award for Outstanding Actress in a Daytime Drama Series. The award was given every year since the 1993 ceremony and later retired in 2015. Victoria Rowell holds the record for most wins in this category with 12.

Winners and nominees
Winners are listed first and highlighted in bold.

1990s

2000s

2010s

Multiple wins and nominations

Wins

 12 wins
 Victoria Rowell

 4 wins
 Tatyana Ali

 2 wins
 Debbi Morgan
 Tonya Williams

Nominations

 15 nominations
 Tonya Williams

 12 nominations
 Victoria Rowell

 9 nominations
 Tracey Ross

 7 nominations
 Christel Khalil

 5 nominations
 Tatyana Ali
 Renée Jones

 4 nominations
 Debbi Morgan

 3 nominations
 Julia Pace Mitchell
 Amelia Marshall

 2 nominations
 Angell Conwell
 Yvette Freeman
 Marla Gibbs
 Kristolyn Lloyd
 Eva Marcille
 Tamara Tunie

References

NAACP Image Awards
Television awards for Best Actress